Eupterote alba is a moth in the family Eupterotidae. It was described by Charles Swinhoe in 1892. It is found on Luzon in the Philippines.

References

Moths described in 1892
Eupterotinae
Insects of the Philippines